Tatiana Alves dos Santos (born June 19, 1978 in Belo Horizonte) is a Brazilian volleyball player. She is 183 cm. She played for Blumenau (Furb), Lupo Nautico, Farça Olimpica, Zaon, sparta(Bh) Vassauras (RJ) in Brazil, Zarechie Odintsova in Russia, Beşiktaş J.K., Fenerbahçe Acıbadem and VakıfBank Güneş Sigorta in Turkey and JT Marvelous in Japan. Now, she currently plays for Omsk in Russia.

External links
 Player profile at fenerbahce.org

1978 births
Living people
Sportspeople from Belo Horizonte
Brazilian women's volleyball players
Brazilian expatriate sportspeople in Japan
Fenerbahçe volleyballers
VakıfBank S.K. volleyballers
Outside hitters
Brazilian expatriate sportspeople in Turkey
Brazilian expatriates in Russia
Expatriate volleyball players in Japan
Expatriate volleyball players in Turkey
Expatriate volleyball players in Russia